The ancient Egyptian Single-Stair hieroglyph, Gardiner sign listed no. O40 is a single staircase in the Gardiner subset for "buildings, parts of buildings, etc." A second full double-staircase is no. O41, O41

In the Egyptian language, the single stair hieroglyph is used as a determinative.

See also
Gardiner's Sign List#O. Buildings, Parts of Buildings, etc.
List of Egyptian hieroglyphs

References

Betrò, 1995. Hieroglyphics: The Writings of Ancient Egypt, Betrò, Maria Carmela, c. 1995, 1996-(English), Abbeville Press Publishers, New York, London, Paris (hardcover)
Budge, 1978, (1920).  An Egyptian Hieroglyphic Dictionary, E.A.Wallace Budge, (Dover Publications), c 1978, (c 1920), Dover edition, c 1978; cliv-(154) and 1314 pp. (In two volumes) (softcover)

Egyptian hieroglyphs: buildings and parts-of-buildings-etc